Peter John Leswick (July 12, 1916 – June 20, 2005) was a Canadian ice hockey right winger. In the 1936–37 season, he played one game for the New York Americans, and scored one goal. In the 1944–45 season, he played two games for the Boston Bruins. The rest of his career, which lasted from 1936 to 1952, was spent in various minor leagues. He was born in Saskatoon, Saskatchewan. Pete is the brother of Jack Leswick and Tony Leswick.

Career statistics

Regular season and playoffs

External links
 
Obituary at LostHockey.com

1916 births
2005 deaths
Boston Bruins players
Buffalo Bisons (AHL) players
Canadian ice hockey right wingers
Cleveland Barons (1937–1973) players
Fort Worth Rangers players
Ice hockey people from Saskatchewan
Indianapolis Capitals players
Kansas City Americans players
Kansas City Greyhounds players
New Haven Eagles players
New York Americans players
Seattle Ironmen players
Seattle Seahawks (ice hockey) players
Seattle Totems (WHL) players
Spokane Clippers players
Sportspeople from Saskatoon